The ATP Tour is the modern top-level men's professional tennis circuit. It was introduced in 1990 and it's administered by the Association of Tennis Professionals (ATP). All the records listed here are only for the players who played most of their careers on the ATP Tour and they're based on official ATP data. The names of active players appear in boldface. However, no boldface is used in lists exclusively for active players.

All tournaments

Titles & finals

 Active players in bold.

Other active players

Matches
 Active players in bold (correct ''as of 2023 Indian Wells Masters).

Other active players

Big Titles

'Big Titles' according to the ATP are the Grand Slam tournaments, Masters tournaments, ATP Finals and Olympics.

Grand Slam tournaments

ATP Finals

ATP Masters tournaments

Career Golden Masters 
 The tournament at which the Golden Masters was completed indicated in bold.

500 series tournaments
This is the class of tournaments in which the winner earns 500 ATP ranking points. This format began in 2009.
The records include the equivalent former classes called the ATP Championship Series (1990–99) and ATP International Series Gold (2000–08).

250 series tournaments
This is the class of tournaments in which the winner earns 250 ATP ranking points. This format began in 2009.
The records include the equivalent former classes called the ATP World Series (1990–99) and ATP International Series (2000–08).

Olympics

Tennis was reinstated as an official Olympic sport in 1988.

ATP rankings

Miscellaneous

Top 10 head-to-head record
 minimum 50 wins (correct as of 2023 Indian Wells Masters)

Unbeaten streaks
▲ indicates active streaks.

Titles per consecutive seasons

Prize money

Youngest and oldest

Longest matches

Best-of-three sets

Statistics leaders
Correct as of 2023 Indian Wells Masters  .

Aces

Doubles

All tournaments

Titles and finals

Matches

ATP Finals

ATP Masters tournaments

500 series tournaments

250 series tournaments

See also 

 Lists of tennis records and statistics
 All-time tennis records – Men's singles
 Open Era tennis records – Men's singles
 List of Grand Slam men's singles champions
 List of ATP Tour top-level tournament singles champions
 List of ATP number 1 ranked singles tennis players
 Tennis Masters Series records and statistics
 ATP Finals
 List of tennis tournaments
 All-time tennis records – Women's singles
 Open Era tennis records – Women's singles
 List of tennis players career achievements
 WTA Tour records

Notes

References

+
Tennis records and statistics